Cesare Battisti may refer to:
Cesare Battisti (politician) (1875–1916), Italian politician
Cesare Battisti (terrorist) (born 1954), former member of the Armed Proletarians for Communism in Italy
Italian destroyer Cesare Battisti, in service 1927–1941

Battisti, Cesare